Eucalyptus youmanii, commonly known as Youman's stringybark, is a species of small to medium-sized tree that is endemic to eastern Australia. It has rough, stringy bark on the trunk and branches, lance-shaped or curved adult leaves, flower buds in groups of seven, white flowers and hemispherical fruit.

Description
It has rough, stringy, greyish, furrowed bark on the trunk and branches. Flowering occurs in February and March and the flowers are white.

Taxonomy and naming
Eucalyptus youmanii was first formally described in 1930 by William Blakely and Ernest McKie in Proceedings of the Linnean Society of New South Wales from material collected near Guyra in 1920. The specific epithet (youmanii) honours Thomas Youman (1874–1962), who, with Blakely and McKie, collected the type specimens on his farm.

Distribution and habitat
Youman's stringybark grows in woodland on poor soils from the Armidale-Guyra area in New South Wales to near Stanthorpe in Queensland.

References

youmanii
Myrtales of Australia
Flora of New South Wales
Flora of Queensland
Trees of Australia
Plants described in 1930